Mohammad-Taqi Khan Pessian (1892 – 3 October 1921), more commonly known as Colonel Pessian, was an Iranian gendarme, fighter pilot and warlord who formed and led the short-lived Autonomous Government of Khorasan in 1921. He was killed in a battle with forces sent by Ahmad Qavam, the prime minister at the time.

Biography
Pessian was born into an aristocratic Azerbaijani family in Tabriz originating in the Caucasus. Pessian's family possessed strong military traditions, his uncle General Hamzeh Khan Pessian was a commander in the Persian Cossack Brigade, his cousins
Heydar Qoli Khan Pessian – father of Iranian author and journalist, Mahtalat Pessian, – Ali Qoli Khan Pessian, Gholam Reza Khan Pessian and he himself served in Gendarmerie.

In Tabriz Mohammad Taqi was educated in sciences, Turkish, Persian, Arabic and foreign languages. In 1907 he left for Tehran to continue his education. After 5 years he took up the rank of Second Lieutenant in the Gendarmerie, within two years he was promoted to captain. After that he held a variety of posts such as Second Commander in a battalion in Qazvin, served in Hamedan and Yazd and also was an instructor and interpreter at Gendarmerie school in Yusef Abad, Tehran. He was promoted to Major when World War I broke out.

In November 1915 as commander of the Gendarmerie in Hamedan he launched an attack on the pro-Russian Persian Cossack Brigade at the Battle of Musalla. His gendarmes managed to disarm the Persian Cossacks and Mohammad Taqi managed to convince some of the cossacks to join his forces in a patriotic speech he made to them after their defeat. Mohammad Taqi and Major Azizollah Khan Zarghami as Gendarmerie commanders could not defend Hamedan against an advancing Russian Caucasus Army which was superior in numbers and weapons. The gendarmes retreated to Kermanshah where they were defeated by the Russians, with many fleeing to the Ottoman Empire. August 1916 saw the return of gendarmes to Kermanshah but again were defeated and this time many went to live in exile in Istanbul while Mohammad Taqi returned to live in exile in Berlin.

During his time in Berlin, he was trained as a pilot in the German Airforce and was rewarded with the Eisernes Kreuz Medal for shooting down more than 25 enemy aircraft during World War I. He also translated many works from Persian to/from French, German and English, some of these included Alphonse de Lamartine and Rabindranath Tagore. He also wrote two books in Persian, Sargozasht-e yek javan-e vatandoust and Jang-e Moqaddas az Baghdad ta Iran.

In 1920 Mohammad Taqi returned to Iran and joined the Gendarmerie. In June 1920 he was promoted to the rank of colonel and in September 1920 he became commander of Gendarmerie of Khorasan. On 3 April 1921 in a military coup with his small force of only 200 gendarmes, he had Ahmad Qavam, the Governor-general of Khorasan, arrested and sent him to Tehran where he was imprisoned. He then became head of the provincial Autonomous Government of Khorasan. 
In June, Ahmad Qavam was released from prison and became Premier of Iran. He was determined to take revenge & suppress Pessian. He did so by gaining the approval of Reza Khan & dispatching the Cossack forces to Khorasan. Having previously been the governor of that province, Qavam had developed a strong relationship with the local chieftains and dispatched them to confront Pessian also. Sardar Mo’azez Khan Bojnurdi succeeded in gaining the cooperation of the Shirvan chieftains in mobilizing the kurds in Quchan. To combat this, Pessian gathered his scant forces to face the insurgency in Ja’farabad (near Quchan). This occurred on 3 October 1921 when Pessian and his small force of 150 gendarmes faced a force of strong 1,000 plus mounted Kurdish tribesmen. In the fight that ensued some of the Gendarmes left the battle field. Many of Pessian's comrades were killed and he was eventually surrounded and beheaded.  His head was brought to Tehran to prove that he had been killed. For five continuous years after his death, on 3 October people of Khorasan mourned his death.

He is buried in Mashhad, Khorasan in the same garden that contains Nader Shah's tomb.

Achievements in Germany 
In Germany, he continued his military training, first in the German air force and then in the infantry. He also engaged in a variety of intellectual, cultural and political activities. He wrote an account of his own life, Sargozasht-e Yek Javān-e Vatandust, and of his experiences in western  during the war, Jang-e Moqaddas Az Baghdād Tā Irān. He translated widely between Persian and various European languages, including German, French and English. His love of poetry, especially that which was politically committed, was particularly evident and his choice of works for translation, for example of Alphonse de Lamartine and Rabindranath Tagore, illustrated his own romantic nationalism. He studied European music, learning to play the piano, and transposed Persian national songs into German. On a more overtly political level he was in contact with the Iranian radicals led by Hassan Taqizadeh and grouped around the periodical Kavih, for which he occasionally wrote articles.

References 

Qiyam-e Kolonel Mohammad Taqi Khan-e Pessian dar Khorasan (Uprising of Colonel Mohammad Taqi Khan Pessian in Khurasan), A.Azari, Tehran, Safialishah, 1989
An Experiment in Revolutionary Nationalism: The Rebellion of Colonel Muhammad Taqi Khan Pasyan in Mashhad, April–October 1921, Stephanie Cronin, Journal of Middle Eastern Studies, Vol.33, No. 4 October 1997, pp. 693–750.
Institute of Iranian Contemporary Historical Studies, qatl-e Mohammad Taqi Khan Pessian, Niloufar Kasra.
Institute of Iranian Contemporary Historical Studies, Colonel Pessian Photos, Mehdi Jangravi.
faceofiran

External links

1892 births
1921 deaths
Iranian expatriates in Germany
People from Tabriz
Luftstreitkräfte personnel
German World War I pilots
Recipients of the Iron Cross
Iranian Gendarmerie personnel
Democrat Party (Persia) politicians
Iranian flying aces
Warlords